Manny Alexander Rodríguez Baldera (born 23 May 1998) is a Dominican footballer who plays as a defender for Spanish Primera División RFEF club SD Logroñés and the Dominican Republic national team.

Early life
Born in Santiago de los Caballeros, Rodríguez moved with his family to Spain when he was 8. There, his family has settled in Madrid, near Vicente Calderón Stadium.

Club career
Rodríguez began his football career at 15. He started playing for the youth teams of AV La Chimenea and ED Moratalaz, before joining Atlético Madrid youth ranks in 2015.

International career
Rodríguez first represented the Dominican Republic at under-20 level. He made his senior international debut in 2021.

References

 

1998 births
Living people
People from Santiago de los Caballeros 
Dominican Republic footballers
Association football defenders
Dominican Republic international footballers
Dominican Republic emigrants to Spain
Naturalised citizens of Spain
Footballers from Madrid
Spanish footballers
Atlético Madrid B players
Celta de Vigo B players
Hércules CF players
CF Rayo Majadahonda players
Segunda División B players